Megalagrion oahuense is a species of damselfly in the family Coenagrionidae. It is endemic to Hawaii. It is the only known species of odonate with terrestrial nymphs.

References

Encyclopædia Britannica Macropedia.

Coenagrionidae
Insects of Hawaii
Biota of Oahu
Endemic fauna of Hawaii
Endangered fauna of Hawaii
Odonata of Oceania
Insects described in 1884
Taxa named by Thomas Blackburn (entomologist)
Taxonomy articles created by Polbot